Copa Norte was a Brazilian football competition contested between North region teams. Also with teams from the states of Maranhão and Piauí in the Northeastern.

From 1997 to 1999, the Copa Norte champions granted qualification to Copa CONMEBOL.

From 2000 to 2002, the Copa Norte champions granted qualification to the Copa dos Campeões.

List of champions

Note 1: Losing semi-finalists are listed in alphabetical order.

Records and statistics

Finalists

Performance by State

External links
RSSSF

 
Norte